Commerce College, Kokrajhar is a college for commerce in Kokrajhar, established on 17 March 1985 through a resolution adopted in a public meeting held at Pragati Bhawan, Kokrajhar.

Motto
Dissemination of information and knowledge as a centre of excellence in higher education by imparting quality education and pursuing research studies.

Departments
The college have the following departments:
Higher Secondary two-year course in Commerce & Arts under Assam Higher Secondary Education Council
B.Com. (Three Year Degree Course in 1 +1 +1 Pattern) under Gauhati University.
Short-term Professional Certificate & Diploma Courses.
Bachelor of Business Administration (BBA) - Three year degree course under Gauhati University.
 And in 2017 M.com have also been included in this institute .(1+1)

Facilities

College Library and Reading Room
Students may borrow books from the library against the Library Cards. They may read various newspapers and journals in the reading room of the library.

There is a book bank facility meant for the poor and needy students.

Canteen
The college canteen provides refreshments for the staff and students at a reasonable rate with moderate atmosphere.

Parking
There is a parking shed for vehicles and Bicycles in the College.

Drinking Water
Purified drinking water facility is available for all in the college.

Auditorium
The college has a well equipped auditorium with the sitting capacity of 500.

Reservation of seats
Reservation policy of the Government of India is strictly maintained during admission. 

Two seats each are reserved in various courses for students distinguishing in sports and culture. One seat each is reserved for applicants of the NCC and Scouts & Guides.

References

Commerce colleges in India
Business schools in Assam
Kokrajhar
Educational institutions established in 1985
1985 establishments in Assam